The year 2005 in art involves various significant events.

Events
 June – Zentrum Paul Klee, a museum dedicated to Paul Klee, designed by Renzo Piano, opens in Bern, Switzerland.
 September 30 – Controversial drawings of Muhammad are printed in the Danish newspaper Jyllands-Posten.
 Museum of Art Fakes opens in Vienna.

Awards
Archibald Prize – John Olsen, Self portrait Janus Faced
Beck's Futures – Christina Mackie
Caldecott Medal for children's book illustration – Kevin Henkes, Kitten's First Full Moon
Rolf Schock Prize in Visual Arts – Kazuyo Sejima and Ryue Nishizawa
Turner Prize – Simon Starling, Shedboatshed
The Venice Biennial (June 12 – November 6):
Lion d'Or Golden Lion for Lifetime Achievement: Barbara Kruger (USA)
Lion d'Or for Best Pavilion: Annette Messager (France)
Wynne prize – Jenny Sages, The Road to Utopia

Works

 February 12–27 – The Gates, installation art by Christo and Jeanne-Claude in Central Park, New York City.
May 10 – Dedication of Memorial to the Murdered Jews of Europe, designed by architect Peter Eisenman originally working with sculptor Richard Serra (both Americans), in Berlin.
July 9 – Unveiling of Monument to the Women of World War II, sculpted by John W. Mills, in Whitehall, London.
 John Aiken – Monolith and Shadow (sculpture outside University College Hospital, London)
 Louise Bourgeois – Father and Son (sculpture in Seattle)
 Herbert Dreiseitl – Artwall (installation art in Portland, Oregon)
 Barry Flanagan – Pirate's Wheel
 Kennardphilips - Photo Op, photomontage of Tony Blair in front of burning oil
 Damian Loeb – "Straw Dogs"
 Roy McMakin
 Love & Loss (installation art in Seattle)
 Untitled (Wooden Toilet)
 Ron Mueck – In Bed (sculpture in Queensland Gallery of Modern Art)
 Odd Nerdrum – Cannibals
 Dennis Oppenheim – Engagement (sculptures)
 Bridget Riley – Red Movement

Exhibitions
Aleksander Balos – Travaux récents (organised by Arts nord sud, at Espace Griffon, Crédit Municipal, Paris, France)

Deaths

January to March
1 January – Eugene J. Martin, American visual artist (b.1938).
2 January – Frank Kelly Freas, American illustrator and painter (born 1922)
4 January
Guy Davenport, American writer, translator, illustrator, painter, intellectual and teacher (b.1927).
Alton Tobey, American painter, historical artist, muralist, portraitist, illustrator and teacher (b.1914).
14 January
Conroy Maddox, English surrealist painter, collagist, writer and lecturer (b.1912).
Rudolph Moshammer, German fashion designer (b.1940).
25 January
Philip Johnson, American major art collector, MoMA curator, influential architect (born 1906)
Max Velthuijs, Dutch painter, illustrator and author (b.1923).
27 January
Gordon Lambert, Irish art collector (b.1919).
Aurélie Nemours, French painter (b.1910).
7 February – Paul Rebeyrolle, French painter (b.1926).
18 February – Harald Szeemann, Swiss curator and art historian (b.1933).
21 February – Zdzisław Beksiński, Polish painter, photographer, and fantasy artist (b.1929).
15 March – Judith Scott, American outsider fiber sculptor (b.1943).
20 March – Walter Hopps, American museum director and curator (b.1932).

April to June
5 April
Dale Messick, first American woman syndicated comic strip artist (b.1906)
Neil Welliver, American painter (b.1929)
10 April – Carl Abrahams, Jamaican painter (b.1911)
11 April – André François, French cartoonist (b.1915)
13 April
Philip Pavia, American sculptor (b.1912)
Juan Zanotto, Italian-born Argentine comic book artist (b.1935)
19 April – Clement Meadmore, Australian-born American sculptor (b.1929)
22 April – Eduardo Paolozzi, Scottish-born sculptor and artist (b.1924)
27 May 
Astrid Zydower, German-born British sculptor (b.1930)
Fay Godwin, English landscape photographer (b.1931)
12 June – David Whitney, American independent curator and art dealer (b.1939)
21 June – Al Loving, African American abstract impressionist painter (b.1935)

July to December
22 July – Dragoš Kalajić, Serbian painter (born 1943)
26 July – Robert C. Turner, American potter (b.1913)
27 July – Al Held, American Abstract expressionist painter (b.1928)
1 August – Constant Nieuwenhuys, Dutch painter, one of the innovators of Unitary Urbanism (b.1920)
16 August – Joe Ranft, American magician, animation storyboard artist and voice actor (b.1960)
22 August – Juliet Pannett, English portrait artist (born 1911)
26 August – Robert Denning, American interior designer (b.1927)
22 October – Arman, French-born American artist (b.1928)
28 October – Raymond Hains, French artist and photographer (b.1926)
11 November – Patrick Anson, 5th Earl of Lichfield, English photographer (b.1939)
2 December – Lillian Browse, English art dealer and historian (born 1906)

See also
 List of years in art

References

 
 
2000s in art
Years of the 21st century in art